Ondřej Kacetl (born October 15, 1990) is a Czech professional ice hockey goalie. He is currently playing for HC Dynamo Pardubice of the Czech Extraliga.

Kacetl made his Czech Extraliga debut playing with Mountfield HK during the 2013-14 Czech Extraliga season.

References

External links

1990 births
Living people
Stadion Hradec Králové players
Czech ice hockey goaltenders
HC Dynamo Pardubice players
People from Znojmo
Sportspeople from the South Moravian Region
HC Frýdek-Místek players
HC Oceláři Třinec players
HC Dukla Jihlava players
BK Havlíčkův Brod players
HC Stadion Litoměřice players
HC ZUBR Přerov players